Bindal is a municipality in the Helgeland region in the extreme southwest part of Nordland county, Norway. The administrative centre is the village of Terråk. Other villages include Bindalseidet, Holm, Vassås, Horsfjord and Åbygda.

The  municipality is the 81st largest by area out of the 356 municipalities in Norway. Bindal is the 304th most populous municipality in Norway with a population of 1,406.

General information

In 1838, the parish of Bindal was split into two municipalities (see formannskapsdistrikt law) because the parish included land in both the counties of Nord-Trøndelag and Nordland. The new law required that municipalities be located only in one county, so the parish was divided into two municipalities:  Nordbindalen and Sørbindalen. In 1852, the county border was moved south to its current position and the municipalities of Nordbindalen and Sørbindalen were merged back together to form the municipality of Bindal. On 1 January 1964, the area around the inner Bindalsfjorden and the village of Lande (population: 296) was transferred to Brønnøy Municipality.

Name
The municipality (originally the parish) is named after the Bindalen valley. The first element is the genitive case of the river name  (now called the river Åbjøra). The river name is derived from the word  which means "(female) bear".

Coat of arms
The coat of arms was granted on 9 February 1990. The official blazon is "Azure, six nails Or in annulo". This means the arms have a blue field (background) and the charge is a circular arrangement of six nails or rivets. The charge has a tincture of Or which means it is commonly colored yellow, but if it is made out of metal, then gold is used. The blue color in the field symbolizes the importance of the sea and boating and the circular arrangement of rivets was chosen to symbolize the importance of the boat building industry in Bindal. There are six rivets to represent 6 school districts, 6 originally inhabited islands, and 6 fjords areas in the municipality. The arms were designed by Arvid Sveen.

Churches
The Church of Norway has two parishes within the municipality of Bindal. It is part of the Sør-Helgeland prosti (deanery) in the Diocese of Sør-Hålogaland.

Geography
Bindal borders four municipalities in Trøndelag county: Høylandet and Nærøy in the south, Namsskogan in the southeast, and Leka in the west. Bindal also has borders with the Nordland municipalities of Sømna, Brønnøy, and Grane. The Bindalsfjorden runs through the central part of the municipality.

From the coast, the municipality reaches into the mountains towards the lake Majavatnet in Grane. It also includes part of the lakes Eidevatnet and Fjellvatnet, which also partially lie in Brønnøy municipality. Other lakes include Åbjørvatnet, Kalvvatnet, and Saglivatnet. The river Åbjøra runs through the eastern part of Bindal. Part of the island of Austra is in Bindal.

Government
All municipalities in Norway, including Bindal, are responsible for primary education (through 10th grade), outpatient health services, senior citizen services, unemployment and other social services, zoning, economic development, and municipal roads. The municipality is governed by a municipal council of elected representatives, which in turn elect a mayor.  The municipality falls under the Brønnøy District Court and the Hålogaland Court of Appeal.

Municipal council
The municipal council of Bindal is made up of 17 representatives that are elected to four year terms. The party breakdown of the council is as follows:

Mayors
The mayors of Bindal (incomplete list):

1877-1878 	Karl Julius Arnesen
1911-1919: Johan Lilleheil
1920-1922: Johan Reppen
1923-1925: O. Skaalvik
1926-1928:	Hans Sylten
1929-1931: Johan Lilleheil
1932-1934: Tomas Breivik
1935-1945: Fredrik Sverdrup
1946-1951: Ole Røtting (Ap)
1952-1955: Oddwin Skaiaa (H)
1956-1957: Ole Røtting (Ap)
1958-1959: Oddwin Skaiaa (H)
1960-1963: Ole Røtting (Ap)
1964-1967: Kristen I. Sylten (Ap)
1968-1971: Bertram Bull-Njaa (LL)
1972-1975: Håkon Hald (Sp)
1976-1979: Amund Skotnes (LL)
1980-1983: Kristen I. Sylten (Ap)
1983-2007: Magne H. Paulsen (Ap)
2007-2010: Per-André Johansen (Ap)
2010-2015: Petter Bjørnli (H)
2015-present: Britt Helstad (Ap)

Economy
The most important industries in Bindal are aquaculture, farming and forestry.

Culture
Boat races for Nordland boats have been held annually since 1978 in the main village of Terråk during the last weekend of June. Bindal has a traditional boat-building industry and Nordland boats are still manufactured here.

Education
Bindal has two schools; one of them is classified as independent and therefore not administered by the municipality.

Terråk skole in Terråk is a 1st-10th grade school and the largest in Bindal with approximately 100 students attending it.
Bindalseidet friskole is an independent school located in Bindalseidet. It is a 1st-10th grade school.

Notable people 
 Otto Sverdrup (1854 in Bindal – 1930), a Norwegian sailor and Arctic explorer
 Fredrik Paasche (1886 in Bindal – 1943), a Norwegian educator, author and literary historian
 Carl Ludvig Godske (1906 in Bindal – 1970), a Norwegian mathematician and meteorologist 
 Lisbeth Berg-Hansen (born 1963 in Bindal), a Norwegian salmon farmer and politician

References

External links
Municipal fact sheet from Statistics Norway 

 
Municipalities of Nordland
1852 establishments in Norway